Delamere Dairy is a UK-based company founded in 1985, producing goats milk and other dairy products such as cheeses and yoghurts, sold in supermarkets and other outlets nationally as well as in Ireland, Italy, China, Hong Kong, Singapore, Thailand, Middle East and Caribbean. Delamere Dairy is a member of a British Cheese Board.

History

Delamere Dairy was founded with the purchase of 3 goats by Liz & Roger Sutton in Delamere forest in 1985. 

Delamere Dairy works with goat farms across the UK, and co-packers across the UK and Europe making products to the company’s specifications. Products are sold in both the Delamere brand and supermarket owned labels by retailers and wholesalers throughout the UK. Delamere Dairy currently sells its products in 17 markets overseas.

In 2011 Delamere has opened its first overseas office in Hong Kong and was one of the first UK businesses with a permission to export liquid goats’ milk into Chinese market.

Products
Goats milk is Delamere's primary product. They produce a whole, semi-skimmed and skimmed version of goats milk as an alternative to cows milk. Goats milk has become popular with consumers who have an intolerance to cows milk.

Delamere's products include goat cheeses, yoghurts and butter. The goats milk is also available as UHT milk for longlife.

Delamere has launched a goats milk product for pets under the brand 'Toplife Formula'. The range includes a formula for dogs, puppies, cats and kittens.

Controversies 

In July 2022 an article published in The Independent alleged a supplier to Delamere Dairy was subjecting goats to "violence and neglect". Undercover footage showed lame goats struggling to access food and water points, animals in so much pain they were unable to walk properly and piles of dead goats rotting outside of sheds. A spokesman for the RSPCA said "this footage is distressing to see and raises some serious concerns regarding the treatment of these goats" however Delamere Dairy denied there had been any breaches in animal welfare.

Awards 
In 2011 Delamere has received 'Farm Business of the Year' award at the Farm Business Food & Farming Industry Awards.

In 2015 the farm has won Exporter of The Year award at the Food and Drink Federation Awards gala.

In 2016 the company was awarded The Queen's Award for Enterprise for its international trade achievements.

References

External links

Companies based in Cheshire
Food and drink companies established in 1985
Dairy products companies of the United Kingdom
British companies established in 1985